Paraffin oil may refer to:

 (in British English) paraffin, called kerosene in North American English 
 (in North American English) any of various hydrocarbon oils obtained from petroleum, for example mineral oil